Meaghan Jette Martin (born February 17, 1992) is an American actress and singer known for her work in film, television, and theatre. She is best known for her starring role in the ABC Family television series, 10 Things I Hate About You as Bianca Stratford. She is also well known for her role as Tess Tyler in the Disney Channel television films Camp Rock and its sequel Camp Rock 2: The Final Jam. She has also had guest starring roles in House and Jessie, and played the recurring role of Julie #2 in multiple seasons of MTV's television series Awkward. Martin also starred as Jo Mitchell in Mean Girls 2. Martin is also known for lending her voice for Naminé in the video game series Kingdom Hearts as well as voicing and motion-capturing Jessica from the video game Until Dawn. In 2019, Martin made her professional London stage debut in The Actor's Nightmare at the Park Theatre in London.

Early life
Martin appeared in several community theater productions in Las Vegas such as Peter Pan and performed for her Showteam and later made her professional theater debut as Kendra in the Los Angeles production of 13 by Jason Robert Brown, directed by Todd Graff.

Acting

Martin started her acting career in 2007, in television programs such as Nickelodeon's Just Jordan and CBS's Close to Home, as well as a guest stint in the Disney Channel series The Suite Life of Zack & Cody. Martin was eventually cast as the lead antagonist Tess Tyler in the Disney Channel original movie, Camp Rock, starring Demi Lovato and the Jonas Brothers. Martin was selected by TV Guide in 2008, as one of the "13 Hottest Young Stars to Watch". She was the online host for the 2008 Disney Channel Games.

Martin voiced the character Naminé in all subsequent releases in Kingdom Hearts series, replacing Brittany Snow, who did not return to the series.
Martin starred in the ABC Family sitcom 10 Things I Hate About You as Bianca (originated by Larisa Oleynik in the film version) and received rave reviews for her performance in the series. Mike Hale of The New York Times described Meaghan as "the high point of an excellent ensemble". She also played the role of Megan Kennedy in the independent film Dear Lemon Lima which received the Audience Award for Best Narrative Feature at the Woodstock Film Festival. Martin returned to reprise her role as Tess Tyler in Camp Rock 2: The Final Jam, premiered on September 3, 2010, on Disney Channel. In 2011, Martin played the main character Jo Mitchell in the television film Mean Girls 2, the sequel of the 2004 film Mean Girls. Martin also played the role of Aubrey in the feature film Sironia.

On June 16, 2011, Martin appeared for one night in Super Summer Theatre's live production of "Annie" at Spring Mountain Ranch in Las Vegas, Nevada, in the role of Star-To-Be. Martin is also starring in the web series Wendy as the title character alongside Tyler Blackburn. Wendy is a dark twist on 'Peter Pan'. The series premiered on macys.com on September 15, 2011.
In 2013, Martin appeared in the film adaptation Geography Club as Trish, earning a nomination for Best Performance by an Actress in a Leading Role at L.A. Outfest. Entertainment Tonight wrote "Every year sees the release of one film so culturally important it should be required viewing. This year, that film is Geography Club".

Later in 2013, she appeared in the thriller The Good Mother which aired on Lifetime Channel and was cast as Julie #2 in MTV's Awkward, replacing Sophie Tilson.
Martin voiced and motion-captured the character of Jessica in the PlayStation 4 exclusive Until Dawn opposite Rami Malek and Peter Stormare.

Played the role of Sharon opposite Evan Peters and Juno Temple in the drama feature film Safelight, written and directed by Tony Aloupis.

Martin trained as an actor in London, England. In September 2016 she graduated from the London Academy of Music and Dramatic Art (LAMDA). After re-locating permanently to the UK, it was announced on April 9, 2019, that Martin would make her professional London stage debut in The Actor's Nightmare by Tony award-winning playwright Christopher Durang. The show is a dark satire exploring the entertainment industry. She starred in the world premiere production which played at London's Park Theatre, July 16 – August 10, 2019. The show received mixed reviews, though Martin received unanimously positive reviews for her performance, with The Stage writing "Meaghan Martin - best known for film work - makes a strong stage debut here, nailing her part as a stand-up comic desperate for approval, wincing anxiously every time her laugh track plays". Michael Billington of The Guardian called Martin's performance "Chilling", writing: "Meaghan Martin plays, with a marvellous mix of ingratiation and panic, a collapsing standup who pleadingly asks: 'Do you find me funny or disturbing?' On a lighter note, Martin also appears to great effect as a Hollywood hustler meeting a dithering dramatist".

Martin starred in award-winning short films Wives of the Landed Gentry and British political satire Bad News which premiered at the 2020 London Independent Film Festival at Vue Cinema West End. Martin played Henrietta in the video game Kosmokrats with actor Bill Nighy. Martin also appeared in Naked Times directed by Jake Kuhn, premiering at the Cannes Straight 8 Film Festival.

In December 2020 Martin played Lucy in the LGBTQ+ drama radio series Hell Cats for Audible, directed by Kate Saxon, alongside Adetomiwa Edun, Jonathan Bailey, and Erin Doherty. The series was a Critics Pick for The Sunday Times. Martin filmed the short Before Seven directed by the Ray Sisters, starring in the lead role of Sage in the film.

In March 2021, Martin played Julie in a reading workshop by 3 hearts canvas of the play Smoke by Kim Davies, at the Arcola Theatre in London. The play is a modern adaptation of Miss Julie exploring sexual consent at a BDSM party in New York. Martin starred in the 1950s drama short Tap Twice.

In January 2022 it was announced that Martin will star in the UK premiere of the play Never Not Once at the Park Theatre running through February and March 2022, in a cast including Flora Montgomery and Amanda Bright. Martin plays Eleanor, who is described as "bright, funny and completely happy apart from one small thing: she wants to know who her father is". The play is a "searing new drama about the families we choose and the secrets that can pull them apart" and was the winner of the Jane Chambers Award for Feminist Writing and Eugene O'Neil Award in America.

Never Not Once received positive 4 and 5 star reviews from critics including The Guardian, WhatsOnStage, The Upcoming, and London Theatre. The Guardian called the play "Gut-wrenching, weighty and forceful - a visceral interrogation of the lasting effects and consequences of rape". The Upcoming said "This is a play for our time, the topics it discusses resonate in every corner of society". Critics praised Martin's "superbly acted" performance. Everything Theatre called Martin "spine-tingling and uncomfortably brilliant" and The Arts Desk praised a "pitch-perfect Meaghan Martin". London Theatre wrote "Eleanor is very believably acted by Meaghan Martin with a terrific sense of energy and disbelief at the havoc she has unleashed by her quest for the truth". WhatsOnStage described Eleanor as "imbued with irresistible warmth and energy by Meaghan Martin".

In March 2022 it was announced that Martin would star in the upcoming British rom-com feature film Ten Dates, alongside a cast including Rosie Day, Rhiannon Clements and Sagar Radia. Filming began in April 2022. The film is due for release in February 2023.

Martin starred as Julie in the London première of the play Smoke by Kim Davies at the Southwark Playhouse in February 2023. The production was produced by Katy Galloway Productions and featured Martin's real-life partner Oli Higginson in the opposite role of John. Smoke is a modern adaption of August Strindberg's Miss Julie set at a BDSM party in New York City, and was co-directed by Polina Kalinina and Júlia Levai. The play is described as a "piercingly witty and sometimes painful exploration of gender, sexuality and desire".

Smoke opened at Southwark Playhouse on February 1, 2023, to very positive 4 and 5 star reviews from London critics including 5 stars from The Arts Desk and Theatre News, and 4 stars from WhatsOnStage, Theatre Weekly, London Theatre Reviews, and Everything Theatre. In particular, Martin's performance was highly praised with WhatsOnStage writing "Higginson and Martin are delivering two of the most exciting performances on any current London stage". WhatsOnStage goes on to say "what makes Smoke rise from thought-provoking shocker to unmissable event, is the quality of the acting. Meaghan Martin and Oli Higginson are astonishing. Tender, brutal and utterly convincing, the measured sensuality of their movements contrasting intriguingly with line deliveries so naturalistic they sound like improvisation, this stunning pair mine Davies's text for all its dark humour and ambiguity." The Arts Desk 5 star review from critic Gary Naylor praised Davies' "dazzling Strindberg update" as a "complicated, clever and challenging play unafraid to treat its audience as grown-ups and all the more rewarding for that." Naylor writes that "the co-directors, Polina Kalinina and Júlia Levai are extremely adept at constructing this delicious set up and get super performances from their leads", before concluding that "Meaghan Martin, perfectly captures the coquettish bravado of Julie, that curdles into confusion, fear, and a cruetly both inflicted and endured."

Music
Martin recorded two songs in Camp Rock, "Too Cool" and "2 Stars". Martin sang a version of "When You Wish Upon a Star" for the 2009 re-release of Disney's Pinocchio, as well as appearing in the related music video. The song debuted at number fifty-two on Billboard's Hot Dance Club Songs chart, becoming her first and only chart single. It has since peaked at number thirty-seven.

Martin also recorded a version of the Olivia Newton-John song "Magic" for the Wizards of Waverly Place soundtrack. Martin has partnered with Build-A-Bear Workshop for their "Love.Hugs.Peace" movement. For the ad campaign, Martin recorded a special version of "Let's Talk About Love". Martin also recorded two songs in Camp Rock 2: The Final Jam, "Tear it Down" and "Walkin in My Shoes", alongside the Camp Rock co-star Matthew "Mdot" Finley. Martin also appear on the collaborative song "It's On", which features the co-stars of the film. All songs appear in the soundtrack of the film.

Martin appeared in the music videos "Remember December" by Demi Lovato and "It's On" by the cast of Camp Rock 2: The Final Jam. Martin did not join the Jonas Brothers: Live in Concert tour, with Demi Lovato and the Camp Rock 2 cast, because she was filming Mean Girls 2.

Personal life
Martin became engaged to British actor Oli Higginson in May 2016. They were married on September 24, 2016, in London, UK. Martin lives in East London.

Filmography

Film

Television

Web

Video games

Theatre

Radio

Discography

Other appearances

Other credits

Music videos

As lead artist

Guest appearances

Awards

References

External links

 

21st-century American actresses
American child actresses
American child singers
American women pop singers
American women pianists
American stage actresses
American television actresses
American video game actresses
American voice actresses
Living people
Actresses from Las Vegas
American film actresses
21st-century American women singers
21st-century American pianists
21st-century American women guitarists
21st-century American guitarists
21st-century American singers
1992 births